Beverly Heather D'Angelo (born November 15, 1951) is an American actress who starred as Ellen Griswold in the National Lampoon's Vacation films (1983–2015). She has appeared in over 60 films and was nominated for a Golden Globe Award for her role as Patsy Cline in Coal Miner's Daughter (1980), and for an Emmy Award for her role as Stella Kowalski in the TV film A Streetcar Named Desire (1984). D'Angelo's other film roles include Sheila Franklin in Hair (1979) and Doris Vinyard in American History X (1998).

Early life
D'Angelo was born in Columbus, Ohio, the daughter of Priscilla Ruth ( Smith), a violinist, and Eugene Constantino "Gene" D'Angelo, a bass player and television station manager at WBNS-TV in Columbus. Her father was of Italian descent. Her paternal grandparents, Eugenio and Rosina D'Angelo were from Introdacqua in the Abruzzo region Italy. She has three brothers, Jeff, Tim and Tony. Their maternal grandfather, Howard Dwight Smith, was an architect who designed the Ohio Stadium, nicknamed "the Horseshoe" at Ohio State University.

D'Angelo attended Upper Arlington High School in Upper Arlington, Ohio, a northwest Columbus suburb. In 2009, she was awarded the Upper Arlington Alumni Association (UAAA) Distinguished Alumnus Award for achievement in her career.

D'Angelo worked as an illustrator at Hanna-Barbera Studios and as a singer before pursuing an interest in acting.  While living for a period in Canada, she was a backup singer for American-born rockabilly singer Rompin' Ronnie Hawkins' band The Hawks. After going out on their own they became The Band, a group that is considered legendary.

Career
D'Angelo began acting in the theatre, appearing on Broadway in 1976 in Rockabye Hamlet (also known as Kronborg: 1582), a musical based on Shakespeare's Hamlet. She made her television debut in the first three episodes of the TV mini-series Captains and the Kings in 1976.

After gaining a minor role in Annie Hall in 1977, D'Angelo appeared in a string of hit movies in the late 1970s including Every Which Way But Loose, Hair, and Coal Miner's Daughter, the last earning her a Golden Globe nomination for Best Supporting Actress for her performance as Patsy Cline. She won a Country Music Association award for Album of the Year.

Her biggest break came in 1983 starring with Chevy Chase in National Lampoon's Vacation in the role of Ellen Griswold. She reprised this role in four Vacation sequels and a short film between 1985 and 2015. In the 1980s she starred in many other major comedy films; in the mid-1990s she acted primarily in independent movies. In 1994 D'Angelo returned to the stage and won a Theatre World Award for her performance in the Off-Broadway play Simpatico.

She received an Emmy Award nomination for her performance as Stella Kowalski in the 1984 TV movie version of A Streetcar Named Desire. She later had main roles in a number of made-for-television dramatic films, including Slow Burn, Judgment Day: The John List Story, and Sweet Temptation. In the 2000s D'Angelo had a recurring role on Law & Order: Special Victims Unit as defense attorney Rebecca Balthus. She also worked as a voice actress. In 1992 she had a guest appearance in the third season of The Simpsons as Lurleen Lumpkin, a Southern country singer and waitress in the "Colonel Homer" episode. Sixteen years later in 2008, she appeared in the nineteenth season as the same character in the episode "Papa Don't Leech".

From 2005 to 2011, D'Angelo appeared in the HBO series Entourage playing the role of agent Barbara "Babs" Miller. In 2006 she starred in the independent film Gamers: The Movie. In 2008 D'Angelo had a role in the film Harold & Kumar Escape from Guantanamo Bay as Sally. She played the housemother in the film The House Bunny, and also appeared in the Tony Kaye film Black Water Transit.

In 2014, D'Angelo was cast alongside Chevy Chase in an ABC comedy pilot called Chev & Bev, about a retired couple having to raise their grandchildren. ABC opted against making a series. D'Angelo appeared alongside Chevy Chase in the comedy Vacation, a continuation of the original film, which was released on July 29, 2015.

D'Angelo narrates a short biographical film about Patsy Cline, which is shown to visitors of The Patsy Cline Museum in Nashville, Tennessee. The museum opened to the public on April 7, 2017.

Personal life
In 1981, D'Angelo married Italian Don Lorenzo Salviati, the only son and heir of Don Forese Salviati, 5th Duke Salviati, Marchese di Montieri and Boccheggiano, Nobile Romano Coscritto, and his wife, the former Maria Grazia Gawronska.

Later, she began a relationship with Anton Furst, an Academy Award-winning production designer, who died by suicide in 1991. She was in a relationship with actor Al Pacino from 1997 until 2003. The couple has twins conceived through IVF, a son and daughter born January 25, 2001.

Filmography

Film

Television films

Television series

References

External links

 
 
 
 

Actresses from Columbus, Ohio
American women singers
American film actresses
American people of English descent
American people of German descent
American people of Irish descent
American people of Italian descent
American people of Scottish descent
American stage actresses
American voice actresses
Italian-American culture in Ohio
Living people
Singers from Ohio
People from Upper Arlington, Ohio
American television actresses
20th-century American actresses
21st-century American actresses
Theatre World Award winners
1951 births